Symmoca christenseni is a moth of the family Autostichidae. It is found in Greece.

References

Moths described in 1982
Symmoca
Moths of Europe